China competed at the 2015 World Championships in Athletics in Beijing, China, from 22 to 30 August 2015.

Medalists
The following Chinese competitors won medals at the Championships.

Results

Men
Track and road events

Field events

Women
Track and road events

Field events

References

Nations at the 2015 World Championships in Athletics
World Championships in Athletics
China at the World Championships in Athletics